Dysfunctional is the fifth studio album by heavy metal band Dokken, released in 1995. It was the band's first release after reuniting in 1993.

Originally intended to be a Don Dokken solo album, it morphed into a Dokken album when guitarist George Lynch was brought back into the fold, with Jeff Pilson and Mick Brown already on board. The original album was produced for the Japanese market and released there in December 1994 on JVC/Victor, simply titled Dokken. When Sony Music signed the band to the label internationally, the album was remixed and three additional songs recorded, "Hole In My Head", a cover of Emerson, Lake & Palmer's "From the Beginning", and "If the Good Die Young" (the bonus track on the Japanese version). This last song is a heavily re-worked new version of the song "Snake Eyes", which Jeff Pilson had recorded with his post-Dokken band, Flesh & Blood (eventually re-named War & Peace). "Snake Eyes" was finally released as part of the War & Peace - The Flesh and Blood Sessions album in 1999.

Although Dysfunctional entered the chart respectably at No. 47 at a time when 1980s hard rock and heavy metal had largely declined, sales quickly dropped off and were not enough to reach gold RIAA certification. In a later interview, Don Dokken claimed that the album had sold 400,000 copies .

The song "Too High to Fly" was released as a promo single from the album and was a minor hit. It is one of the post 80s Dokken songs that is played live on a consistent basis.

Track listing

Personnel

Dokken
Don Dokken - vocals, producer
George Lynch - lead and rhythm guitars
Jeff Pilson - bass guitar
Mick Brown - drums

Production
Michael Wagener - producer, engineer, mixing on tracks 5, 8-10
Wyn Davis - engineer, mixing
Darian Rundall, Don Dokken, Kenny Oswald - engineers
George Marino - mastering at Sterling Sound, New York
John Keane - orchestral arrangements on track 5
John Kalodner - A&R

Charts

References

Dokken albums
1995 albums
Columbia Records albums
Albums produced by Michael Wagener